The Kinabalu giant red leech (Mimobdella buettikoferi) is a large bright orange-red coloured leech that is endemic to Mount Kinabalu, Borneo.

Etymology
The holotype was collected by Johann Büttikofer, and the specific name buettikoferi is derived from his surname.

Ecology
The Kinabalu leech is not hematophagic and feeds only on worms such as the Kinabalu giant earthworm, Pheretima darnleiensis. It lives in the damp leaf litter and soil that often accumulates in fissures. It can be found in Kinabalu Park at an elevation of  where the trail runs over a rocky outcrop near to the Mempening and Paka Cave shelters. It is usually seen during or after heavy downpours.

Taxonomy
Kinabalu giant red leech is currently classified under the genus Mimobdella of the family Salifidae. However Nakano (2011) has questioned its inclusion within the genus (as well as that of Mimobdella thienemani). The internal and external morphological characteristics of these two species do not fit the generic diagnostic criteria as established by the type species and the only other species in the genus, Mimobdella japonica.

References

External links
The giant leech and giant worm in Kinabalu Park, Borneo, Malaysia
Monster leech swallows giant worm

Leeches
Animals described in 1897
Endemic fauna of Borneo
Invertebrates of Malaysia
Fauna of Mount Kinabalu